Dijana "DiDi" Haračić (born 12 April 1992) is a Bosnian professional footballer who plays as a goalkeeper for Angel City FC in the National Women's Soccer League (NWSL).

Early life
Born in Sarajevo, Haračić moved to the United States at the age of 2 during the Bosnian War. Her father, Izet Haračić, played professional football in Germany and represented Bosnia and Herzegovina at the 1994 Winter Olympics as a bobsledder.

College career

Loyola University
Haračić played for Loyola University between 2010 and 2013. During that time, she established herself as the first choice keeper for the Greyhounds. She was named MAAC Player of the Year in 2012 and helped the Greyhounds to a MAAC Championship and Women's NCAA tournament.

Professional career

D.C. United
Haračić started her professional career with D.C. United Women between 2011 and 2012 where she would make 7 appearances during that time. When the D.C. United Women rebranded as the Washington Spirit in 2013 to compete in the newly formed NWSL, Haračić stayed with the organization as the starting keeper for the Reserves playing all 12 matches and posting a 0.580 goals against average.

Western New York Flash
During the 2014 season, Haračić signed with the Western New York Flash. Her Flash career would be hampered by a knee injury, limiting her only appearance for the Flash to the season finale, a 3–3 draw against the Chicago Red Stars. Haračić was waived at the conclusion of the season.

Krokom/Dvärsätts IF
Haračić would end up signing with Div 2 Södra Norrland side Krokom/Dvärsätt IF.

Return to Washington Spirit
In 2016, Haračić returned to the Washington Spirit organization, playing for the Reserves in the WPSL. Ahead of the 2017 season, Haračić signed with the first team. Over two seasons with the Spirit, Haračić made 9 appearances.

NJ/NY Gotham FC
In January 2019, Haračić was traded to Sky Blue FC along with teammates Estelle Johnson and Caprice Dydasco for the third overall and 29th picks of the 2019 NWSL College Draft.

Angel City FC
On 8 December 2021, Haračić was traded to Angel City FC.

International career
Haračić was called up to the Bosnia and Herzegovina national team and in 2018 she started in goal for a World Cup qualifying match against Russia.

References

External links
Loyola Greyhounds bio
 

1992 births
Living people
Bosnia and Herzegovina emigrants to the United States
American women's soccer players
Bosnia and Herzegovina expatriate women's footballers
Bosnia and Herzegovina women's international footballers
Loyola Greyhounds women's soccer players
National Women's Soccer League players
People from Loudoun County, Virginia
Soccer players from Virginia
Sportspeople from the Washington metropolitan area
Washington Spirit players
Women's association football goalkeepers
NJ/NY Gotham FC players
Western New York Flash players
D.C. United Women players
Angel City FC players
Expatriate women's footballers in Sweden
American expatriate women's soccer players
American expatriate sportspeople in Sweden
Bosnia and Herzegovina expatriate sportspeople in Sweden